The 1969–70 season was the 71st season for FC Barcelona.

La Liga

Results

External links

webdelcule.com

FC Barcelona seasons
Barcelona